West Lebanon is a section (pop. approx 4,100) of the city of Lebanon, New Hampshire, on the Connecticut River. The area contains a major shopping plaza strip along New Hampshire Route 12A, serving the Upper Valley communities along Interstates 89 and 91. West Lebanon also hosts the Lebanon Municipal Airport, a number of small software and tech businesses, and a regional daily newspaper, the Valley News. The village serves as a bedroom community for nearby Dartmouth College.

West Lebanon was the site of Lebanon's first settlement in 1761. The village later developed into a regional hub for rail transport, although at that time it was better known to travelers as Westboro. By the 1950s, however, the rail industry had shrunk significantly. The rail service through West Lebanon was eventually terminated, and the village of White River Junction, Vermont, across the Connecticut River, took over most of the remaining services.

Today commerce has replaced transportation as the basis of the economy, and West Lebanon serves as the commercial hub for a United States micropolitan area of over 170,000 people.

References

Unincorporated communities in Grafton County, New Hampshire
Unincorporated communities in New Hampshire
New Hampshire populated places on the Connecticut River
Lebanon, New Hampshire